Corydon Beckwith (July 24, 1823 – August 18, 1890) was an American jurist and lawyer.

Born in Caledonia County, Vermont, Beckwith studied law in St. Albans, Vermont and was admitted to the Vermont bar in 1844. In 1846, Beckwith was admitted to the Maryland bar. In 1853, Beckwith moved to Chicago, Illinois and practiced law. Beckwith was a Democrat. From January 1864 to June 1864, Beckwith served briefly in the Illinois Supreme Court. Beckwith resumed his law practice. Beckwith died in Chicago, Illinois.

Notes

1823 births
1890 deaths
People from Caledonia County, Vermont
People from St. Albans, Vermont
Politicians from Chicago
Illinois Democrats
Illinois lawyers
Maryland lawyers
Vermont lawyers
Justices of the Illinois Supreme Court
19th-century American judges
19th-century American lawyers